Mustafa Sejmenović (born 3 January 1986) is a Swiss-born Bosnian football centre back who plays for Swiss club FC Portalban/Gletterens.

Club career
He primarily played for hometown club Yverdon-Sport and for Neuchâtel Xamax.
In May 2019 it was confirmed, that Sejmenović would return to Yverdon-Sport FC ahead of the 2019/20 season.

References

External links

1986 births
Living people
People from Yverdon-les-Bains
Swiss people of Bosnia and Herzegovina descent
Citizens of Bosnia and Herzegovina through descent
Association football central defenders
Swiss men's footballers
Switzerland youth international footballers
Bosnia and Herzegovina footballers
Bosnia and Herzegovina under-21 international footballers
Yverdon-Sport FC players
FC Baulmes players
FC Biel-Bienne players
Neuchâtel Xamax FCS players
Swiss Challenge League players
Swiss Super League players
Swiss 1. Liga (football) players
2. Liga Interregional players
Sportspeople from the canton of Vaud